The Liberia Education and Development Party (LEAD) is a political party in Liberia. It participated in the 11 October 2005 elections as part of the three-party United Democratic Alliance (UDA) coalition.

Political parties in Liberia